Campbellstown (also Florence, Florence Station) is an unincorporated community in Jackson Township, Preble County, Ohio United States. The community is served by National Trail High School and the National Trail Local School District.

History
Campbellstown was originally called Florence Station, and under the latter name was laid out in 1852 when the railroad was extended to that point. The present name honors a pioneer settler with the surname Campbell. A post office called Campbellstown was established in 1854, and remained in operation until 1954.

Notable person
Don Elston, baseball player, was born and grew up in Campbellstown.

Notes

Unincorporated communities in Preble County, Ohio
Unincorporated communities in Ohio